Kawempe is an area in the city of Kampala, Uganda's capital. It is also the location of the headquarters of Kawempe Division, one of the five administrative divisions of Kampala.

Location
Kawempe is located on the northwestern edge of Kampala. It is bordered by Nabweru to the north, Kisaasi to the east, Bwaise to the south, Kazo to the southwest and Nansana in Wakiso District to the west. The coordinates of Kawempe are:0°22'45.0"N 32°33'27.0"E (Latitude:0.3792; Longitude:32.5574).

Overview
Kawempe lies on the main highway between Kampala and Masindi. It began as a trading center in the 1950s but has mushroomed into a busy, albeit disorganized, metropolitan area with businesses, small industries, retail shops and a thriving farmers market. Many of the surrounding villages have been turned into low income housing.

Points of interest
Kawempe hosts the following points of interests:
 Headquarters of Kawempe Division
 Bugisu Industries Limited - Manufactures packaging materials
 Harris International Stores
 Kawempe Muslim High School - One of the best in Uganda, academically
Headquarters of the Juma and Zukuli Muslim groups, one of the traditional Muslim sects in Uganda Islamic history.  
 A branch of Bank of Africa (Uganda)
 A branch of Barclays Bank
 A branch of Bank of Baroda
 A branch of DFCU Bank
 A branch of Equity Bank
 A branch of Orient Bank - A member of the Bank PHB Group
 A branch of Stanbic Bank
 A branch of Opportunity Uganda Limited - A Tier II Financial Institution.
 A branch of Pride Microfinance Limited - A Tier III Financial Institution
 Kawempe Central Market
 Kawempe General Hospital - A public hospital under the administration of the Uganda Ministry of Health - In development.
 The main factory and warehouse of the Aya Group, including a  grain milling factory and a bakery.
 GELVIS STUDIOS: 100% Ugandan Film & Television Content Producer & Distributor. 
 EWA MPERESE; COMMERCIAL Building housing SUPREME INVESTMENT PARTNERS, EXPRESS STEEL LTD, GELVIS STUDIOS & AS ENERGY PETRO STATION
 Supreme Investment Partners - Your Partner for Business Development and Finance services in Uganda

See also

References

External links
 Former Sex Workers Graduate At Kawempe

Neighborhoods of Kampala
Cities in the Great Rift Valley
Kawempe Division